The 1986 Mercedes Cup,  was a men's tennis tournament played on outdoor clay courts and held at the Tennis Club Weissenhof in Stuttgart, West Germany that was part of the 1986 Grand Prix circuit. It was the ninth edition of the tournament and was held from 8 September until 14 September 1986. Third-seeded Martín Jaite won the singles title.

Finals

Singles
 Martín Jaite defeated  Jonas Svensson, 7–5, 6–2
 It was Jaite's 2nd singles title of the year and the 3rd of his career.

Doubles
 Hans Gildemeister /  Andrés Gómez defeated  Mansour Bahrami /  Diego Pérez, 6–4, 6–3

References

External links
 Official website 
 ATP tournament profile

Stuttgart Open
Stuttgart Open
Mercedes Cup
Mercedes Cup